Alloclita cerritella is a moth in the family Cosmopterigidae. It was described by Riedl in 1993. It is found in Saudi Arabia and the United Arab Emirates.

References

Natural History Museum Lepidoptera generic names catalog

Antequerinae
Moths described in 1993
Moths of Asia